No Objection Certificate, popularly abbreviated as NOC, is a type of legal certificate issued by any agency, organisation, institute or, in certain cases, an individual. It does not object to the covenants of the certificate. The certification is a requirement at most government-based departments predominantly from the Indian subcontinent.

Examples

Travel purpose 
All Indian nationals, who are staying / working in Nepal require a NOC before flying to any third country for the first time from Nepal. The requirement for providing the NOC by the Consular Wing of the Embassy is as under:

 The applicant should come personally to the embassy with the original passport, original Indian registration certificate, along with photocopy copies of the same;
 Copy of the ticket and valid visa;
 Two passport size photographs;
 NPR 2590/- as consular fees for issuing the NOC.

Embassy provides the NOC to only those Indians who are staying / working in Nepal and are Registered as Indian nationals with the Embassy, if they should approach the embassy one or two days prior to their departure for the third country.

References

 Sample of No Objection Certificate Letter

Law of India